Carabus adangensis is a species of ground beetle in the large genus Carabus.

References

adangensis
Insects described in 1983
Insects of Russia